The 2013 LPGA of Korea Tour was the 36th season of the LPGA of Korea Tour, the professional golf tour for women operated by the Korea Ladies Professional Golf' Association. It consisted of 23 golf tournaments, 20 played in South Korea, two played in China, and one played in Taiwan. Jang Ha-na won three tournaments and was the leading money winner with earnings of ₩689,542,549.

Schedule
The number in parentheses after winners' names show the player's total number wins in official money individual events on the LPGA of Korea Tour, including that event.

Events in bold are majors.

LPGA KEB-HanaBank Championship is co-sanctioned with LPGA Tour.
Kumho Tire Women's Open and Hyundai China Ladies Open are co-sanctioned with China LPGA Tour.
Swinging Skirts World Ladies Masters is co-sanctioned with Taiwan LPGA.

External links
 

LPGA of Korea Tour
LPGA of Korea Tour